The 2012 Sudanese coup d'état attempt was a coup d'état attempt on 22 November 2012 in Sudan against president Omar al-Bashir, who took power in the 1989 Sudanese coup d'état. It started as an attempt to overthrow the government over serious conflicts, upheavals (mainly the 2011–2013 Sudanese protests) and worsening conditions. 13 were arrested during the coup attempt, according to the media.

See also
 2004 Sudanese coup d'état attempt

References

Military coups in Sudan
Coup d'etat attempt
Sudanese coup d'etat attempt
2010s coups d'état and coup attempts
November 2012 events in Africa
Attempted coups d'état in Sudan